Broadmeadow Racecourse is an Australian racecourse for horse racing in the Newcastle suburb of Broadmeadow. It was opened on 27 April 1907 by the Newcastle Jockey Club on land acquired from the Australian Agricultural Company. It replaced a racecourse at Hamilton.

Notable races held at Broadmeadow are the Cameron Handicap, Newcastle Gold Cup, Newcastle Newmarket Handicap, Spring Stakes and Tibbie Stakes.

References

Horse racing venues in Australia
Sport in Newcastle, New South Wales
Sports venues completed in 1907
1907 establishments in Australia